Sengenthal is a municipality  in the district of Neumarkt in Bavaria in Germany.

Local economy
Sengenthal is the headquarters of the construction company Max Bögl the developer of Transport System Bögl who also have a testing site in Sengenthal for their maglev system.

References

Neumarkt (district)